Amir Hamudi Hasan al-Saadi or Amer al-Sadi (born April 5, 1938), "the organizational genius behind the Iraqi superweapons program,"   was Saddam Hussein's liaison with the UN inspectors in the runup to the 2003 invasion of Iraq. Like the defector Hussein Kamel al-Majid, he insisted Iraq had destroyed its prohibited weapons. While he was dismissed by the US as a liar, he was vindicated by the subsequent failure to uncover weapons of mass destruction by the Iraqi Survey Group.

He was #32 on the most-wanted list, and Seven of Diamonds in the card deck.

Detainment 
He turned himself in to coalition forces on April 12, 2003, with the help of ZDF journalists who he asked to monitor and document his surrender. He was detained in Baghdad International Airport as a "High Value Detainee". As such he has been subjected to solitary confinement for 23 hours a day. The International Committee of the Red Cross stated in its confidential report to the coalition authority that this constituted a "serious violation of the Third and Fourth Geneva Conventions". He was both the first person on the most wanted list to turn himself in, and the first to be detained by the U.S.

According to a written Parliamentary answer by Dennis Mcshane MP to Angus Robertson MP, Amer Al Saadi was released by the US on 18 January 2005. However, as detailed here, this claim is highly dubious. A June 20, 2005 Newsweek article reported that a "State Department official...denied al-Sadi had been freed from custody," while in July, 2005 (i.e., well after January), Dr. Rod Barton, an Australian scientist who was a key deputy to Charles Duelfer, made a strong plea for the release of Dr. al-Saadi, which would certainly indicate that someone in a position to know still believed him to be held. Al-Saadi was released in 2005.

Career 
He was awarded a PhD is in physical chemistry from Battersea College of Technology. During his study he married a German in London in October 1963; their common language is English. Mrs al-Saadi raised their children in Hamburg.

He retired a lieutenant general in 1994 and was made a presidential scientific advisor.

References

External links
Why being right on WMD is no consolation to Iraqi scientist labelled enemy of America (Guardian)

Living people
1938 births
Iraqi generals
Iraqi physical chemists
Prisoners and detainees of the United States military
Most-wanted Iraqi playing cards
Iraq War prisoners of war
Iraqi prisoners of war